Eugaurax is a genus of frit flies in the family Chloropidae.

References

Further reading

External links

 Diptera.info

Oscinellinae